Arno Carstens (born 12 March 1972) is a South African musician and artist.

Career
Arno Carstens is a platinum selling, award-winning singer-songwriter based in Cape Town, South Africa.

During his career as the lead singer of The Springbok Nude Girls, and subsequently as a bilingual solo artist; with recordings in both English and Afrikaans; Arno has released multiple albums, spawned a string of successful singles & received numerous awards including Best Rock Album, Best Alternative Album & Song of the Year.

Arno has headlined every major South African music festival, performed at the Isle of Wight Festival, Glastonbury, V Festival, T in the Park and Hard Rock Calling.  He has also toured with The Rolling Stones, U2, Bryan Ferry, Simple Minds, Ultravox, Paulo Nutini and The Police. Arno features as lead vocalist and co-writer on three tracks on the Mike + The Mechanics 2011 album The Road.

Fine art
Arno is also a celebrated fine artist who paints in oils or acrylic on canvas and draws with charcoal on paper.  He has collaborated with celebrated artists, Beezy Bailey and the late Bared de Wet.

Discography
Springbok Nude Girls – Neanderthal 1 (Epic, 1995)

Springbok Nude Girls – It Became a Weapon EP (Epic, 1996)

Springbok Nude Girls – be-vest@iafrica.com EP (Epic, 1997)

Springbok Nude Girls – AfterLifeSatisfaction (Epic, 1997)

Springbok Nude Girls – Omnisofa EP (Epic, 1998)

Springbok Nude Girls – OPTI MUM EP (Epic, 1998)

Springbok Nude Girls – Surpass The Powers (Epic, 1999)

Springbok Nude Girls – Un-E.Z. EP (Epic, 1999)

Springbok Nude Girls – Relaxor (Epic, 2000)

Springbok Nude Girls – The Fat Lady Sings / Best of the Springbok Nude Girls 1995–2001 (Epic, 2001)

Arno Carstens – Another Universe (Sony, 2003)

Springbok Nude Girls – Goddank Vir Klank 1994 – 2004 (Sony, 2004)

Arno Carstens – The Hello Goodbye Boys (SonyBMG, 2005)

Nude Girls – Nude Girls (Exclusive UK release)(Golden Fairy Records/SonyBMG, 2006)

Springbok Nude Girls – Peace Breaker (SonyBMG, 2007)

Springbok Nude Girls Live at London's Astoria DVD (SonyBMG, 2007)

Bhelltower – Bhelltower (SonyBMG, 2008)

Arno Carstens – Wonderful Wild (Sony, 2010)

Arno Carstens – Wonderful Wild Deluxe Edition (Sony, 2010)

Springbok Nude Girls – Apes with Shades (Sony, 2011)

Arno Carstens – Atari Gala (Gallo, 2012)

Arno Carstens – Lightning Prevails (Sheer, 2014)

Arno Carstens – Die Aand EP (Select, 2016)

Arno Carstens – Die Aandblom 13 (Select, 2016)

References

External links
 
 Myspace

21st-century South African women singers
Living people
Place of birth missing (living people)
Musicians from Cape Town
Musicians from London
1972 births
White South African people

South African singer-songwriters
20th-century South African singers